Beyond Measure may refer to:

 Beyond Measure (Jeremy Camp album), 2006
 Beyond Measure (Dynasty album), 2013